We'll Be Together Again is a 1994 album by Lena Horne. At the 1995 Grammy Awards, Horne was nominated for a Grammy for Best Jazz Vocal Performance for this album.

Track listing
 "Something to Live For" (Duke Ellington, Billy Strayhorn)	 
 "Day Follows Day" duet with Johnny Mathis (George Abbott, Shirley Cowell)	 
 "Prelude to a Kiss" (Ellington, Mack Gordon, Irving Mills)	 
 "Love Like This Can't Last" (Strayhorn)		 
 "We'll Be Together Again" (Carl T. Fischer, Frankie Laine)	 
 "A Flower Is a Lovesome Thing" (Strayhorn)	 
 "Old Friend" (Stephen Sondheim)	 
 "You're the One" (Strayhorn)	 
 "Havin' Myself a Time" (Ralph Rainger), (Leo Robin)		 
 "My Mood Is You" (Carl Sigman)	 
 "I'll Always Leave the Door a Little Open" (Richard Rodney)	 
 "Do Nothin' Till You Hear from Me" (Ellington, Bob Russell) 
 "Forever Was a Day" (Mike Renzi, Rodney Jones)		 
 "I've Got to Have You" (Kris Kristofferson)	 
 "My Buddy" (Walter Donaldson, Gus Kahn)

Personnel

Performance
Lena Horne - vocals
Ben Brown - electric bass, acoustic bass
Tracy Wormworth - double bass
Jesse Levy - cello
Akira Tana - drums
Buddy Williams
Rodney Jones - acoustic guitar, electric guitar
Toots Thielemans - harmonica
Eli Fountain - percussion
Frank Owens - piano, arranger, producer
Mike Renzi
Jerome Richardson - tenor saxophone
Houston Person
Sanford Allen - violin

Production
Sherman Sneed - producer
Ken Howard - photography
Jack Vartoogian
David Hajdu - liner notes
Joe Brescia - mastering
Dan Kincaid
Jim Czak - engineer
Shirley Cowell - executive producer
Eric Kohler - design
Robert W. Richards - artwork, illustrations
Victor Deyglio - assistant engineer

References

1994 albums
Lena Horne albums
Blue Note Records albums